Alon Day (Hebrew: אלון דאי, born November 4, 1991) is an Israeli professional stock car racing driver. He currently competes in the NASCAR Whelen Euro Series, driving the No. 24 Chevrolet SS for PK Carsport and is a four-time champion in the series. Day is the first Israeli driver to compete in an IndyCar-sanctioned series, and is also the first Israeli to compete in one of NASCAR's top three touring series.

Early life
Day was born and grew up in Ashdod, Israel, and currently resides in Tel Aviv, Israel, and is Jewish. His father, Avi Day, owns a geological-engineering company involved in mineral drilling, and his mother Maggi originally immigrated to Israel from France. He began his racing career with go-karts at the age of 10. For his bar mitzvah, his father gave him as a present a karting vehicle that cost NIS 20,000.

After high school, he performed three years of military service in the Israel Defense Forces (IDF). He was recognized by the IDF as an outstanding sportsman, the only Israeli in a Formula sport to be accorded that status.  He was accepted into the Israeli Air Force pilots' training course, but gave it up because of his career. If he were not a racing car driver, he would want to be a fighter pilot.

Racing career
Day won the Asian Formula Renault Challenge championship in 2009, when he was 17 years old. He then drove in the German Formula Three Championship in 2010, racing with the Performance Racing team. He finished ninth in points, with a best finish of fourth (twice).

He returned to the series in 2011 driving for HS Engineering. He improved to fourth in points and captured two podium finishes of third place. He also won the pole for the second race at Sachsenring. He made six starts in Formula 3 Euro Series (two race meets – Norisring and Silverstone Circuit) and drove in two races in Austria Formula 3 Cup, good enough for eighth in that championship.

In 2012 Day's career transitioned to North America, where he signed to drive in the Firestone Indy Lights series with Belardi Auto Racing. Day made six starts for the team before they amicably parted ways in June after qualifying at the Iowa Speedway. He was sponsored by the Jewish Racing Drivers Association.

In 2015, he made his NASCAR debut in the season opener at Valencia, posting a top-10 finish. He attained his first NASCAR win at Magione in the semifinals. At the Circuit Zolder Finals weekend, he won the Junior "Jerome Sarran" Trophy. He also won the 2015 NASCAR Whelen Euro Series Most Popular Driver Award.

In 2016 Day won his fourth career NASCAR race in the opening weekend in Valencia, won the second race of the season at Brands Hatch, and at Zolder he won the Junior Trophy classification. He also won the 2016 NASCAR Whelen Euro Series Most Popular Driver Award.

Also in 2016, Day was named one of the 11 members of the 2016–17 NASCAR Next program, which recognizes young successful drivers from around the world who are seeking to improve. Day was the first driver of NASCAR's European circuit (the Whelen Euro Series) to earn the honor.  In August, he joined MBM Motorsports for his Xfinity Series debut at Mid-Ohio Sports Car Course, making Day the first Israeli to compete in a major NASCAR touring series. The effort was supported by Jewish Sarasota, Florida, environmental/waterfront property lawyer David Levin, who provided Day with $60,000 from his retirement account to fund the car. After qualifying 22nd, Day capitalized on the rainy conditions to enter the top ten, where he ran for most of the race before finishing 13th. Day returned at Road America, driving the No. 13 for MBM and finishing 30th after he was forced off course late in the race. In September, Contreras Motorsports hired Day to make his Camping World Truck Series debut at the New Hampshire Motor Speedway, in which he finished 24th.

In January 2017, Day was recognized by Israel's Ministry Of Culture and Sport as Israel's Athlete Of The Year in the motorsports category. On June 11, Day won the NASCAR Whelen Euro race in England on June 11 at Brands Hatch.  Later in June, Day joined BK Racing for his Monster Energy NASCAR Cup Series debut in Sonoma Raceway's Toyota/Save Mart 350, driving the No. 23 Toyota Camry. After starting 32nd, he finished in the same position. He became the first Israeli to compete in a Cup Series race. In mid-October, following a fourth-place finish at the second final of the NASCAR Whelen Euro race at Circuit Zolder, he became the first Israeli driver to win a NASCAR championship, clinching the 2017 championship title after only completing just the first lap, finishing the final standings 53 points ahead of defending and two-time series champion Anthony Kumpen.

On September 17, 2018, it was announced that Day would return to the NASCAR Cup Series driving the No. 23 Camry for BK Racing at Richmond.

In the 2019 season, Day started his season strongly after he won both races at Franciacorta and the first race at Brands Hatch. However, he would retire from both races at Most after he collided with Jacques Villeneuve in the first race and was involved in a first corner incident in the second race. Another troublesome week at Hockenheim would follow, where Day received a post-race time penalty for colliding with Stienes Longin in the first race before retiring from the lead in the second race. Day would eventually finish the season in fourth place with 3 wins, 6 podium finishes, and 9 Top-10 finishes.

On October 4, 2020, Day won his first EuroNASCAR contest of the season at Zolder and also assumed the points lead.

Racing record

Career summary

 Guest driver - Ineligible to score points.

Complete Formula 3 Euro Series results
(key) (Races in bold indicate pole position; races in italics indicate fastest lap)

† As Day was a guest driver, he was ineligible to score points.

Indy Lights

Complete FIA GT Series results

NASCAR
(key) (Bold – Pole position awarded by qualifying time. Italics – Pole position earned by points standings or practice time. * – Most laps led. ** – All laps led.)

Monster Energy Cup Series

Xfinity Series

Camping World Truck Series

 Season still in progress
 Ineligible for series points

Whelen Euro Series – EuroNASCAR PRO
(key) (Bold – Pole position. Italics – Fastest lap. * – Most laps led. ^ – Most positions gained)

See also
Sports in Israel
List of Israelis
List of Jews in sports

References

External links

 
 
 
 Career statistics from Driver Database

1991 births
Israeli Jews
Jewish sportspeople
Living people
People from Ashdod
Israeli racing drivers
Formula BMW Pacific drivers
German Formula Three Championship drivers
FIA Institute Young Driver Excellence Academy drivers
Formula 3 Euro Series drivers
Indy Lights drivers
Blancpain Endurance Series drivers
NASCAR drivers
Asian Formula Renault Challenge drivers
ADAC GT Masters drivers
Austrian Formula Three Championship drivers
Asia Racing Team drivers
Performance Racing drivers
Belardi Auto Racing drivers
Charouz Racing System drivers
EuroInternational drivers